Acacia glandulicarpa, commonly known as the hairy-pod wattle, is a perennial shrub belonging to the genus Acacia and the subgenus Phyllodinea that is native to parts of south eastern Australia.

The shrub has a scattered distribution from the Burra Gorge and Bordertown area in South Australia, through to the Little Desert and Dimboola in Victoria where it is found on rocky hills as a part of scrub or Eucalyptus woodland communities.

Description 
The Hairy-pod Wattle is a dense, rounded, spreading, branched shrub 1-2m high. Foliage is dull olive-green foliage, with grey-brown, pubescent branches and small raised leaf bases along the stems.

Small phyllodes, 5–12 mm long by 3–6 mm broad, with wavy outer margin, one main vein and a secondary one, branchlets minutely hairy, stipules absent.

Flowering between July – October, inflorescence are simple and axillary, either solitary or paired. Deep golden-yellow, globular heads with 6 mm diameter on short peduncle, with flower head carrying 8-20 flowers. Pods are narrowly oblong, covered with short glandular hairs, 15–25 mm long, by 3-5mm broad.

Acacia glandulicarpa has similar attributes to five other Acacia species; A. acinacea, A. aspera, A. daviesii, A. gunnii and A. paradoxa.

Distribution and habitat 
The Hairy-pod Wattle has only been recorded in western Victoria and in South Australia. The population in Victoria is scattered in about 100 woodland sites, located in southern Wimmera, south-west of Horsham and north of Nhill. The small site in South Australia is in the Burra Gorge area.

In gravelly soils and sandy rise, the species is often associated with Yellow Mallee (Eucalyptus incrassata), Dumosa Mallee (Eucalyptus Dumosa), Green Mallee (Eucalyptus viridis), and Bull Mallee (Eucalyptus behriana). 

In locations where soils aren’t as well drained, the species is associated with Yellow Gum (Eucalyptus leucoxylon), Grey Box (Eucalyptus microcarpa) and Buloke (Allocasuarina luehmannii). 

In South Australia, the species is associated with Hopbush (Dodonaea viscosa), Clammy daisy bush (Olearia decurrens) and Pale turpentine bush (Beyeria lechenaultii) on light sandy loams, or Needle wattle (Acacia carneorum), Golden wattle (Acacia pycnantha) and Kangaroo grass (Themeda triandra) on skeletal soils with outcropping shales.

Most sites are on roadsides, small Crown Land remnants or scattered within developed agricultural land, distributed on slopes in the transition zone between heavy and sandy soils. Occurring also in a range of woodland, shrubland, and open mallee vegetation communities.

The species is present in the Little Desert National Park, and conservation reserves at Gerang Gerung, and The John Smith Reserve.

Conservation Status 
Widespread clearing of habitat has been responsible for the range and abundance decline of this species.

As the Hairy-pod Wattle is restricted to less than 100 scattered sites in Victoria and one small site in South Australia, the species is listed as threatened under the Flora and Fauna Guarantee Act 1988 and listed as vulnerable under the Australian Government Environment Protection and Biodiversity Conservation Act 1999.

There are estimated to be about 6,000 – 12,000 plants among the roughly 100 sites, with the Little Desert National Park site accounting for about 25% of the total number.

Most of the remaining sites are small, fragmented, and vulnerable to disturbance, within degraded and weedy vegetation, providing little opportunity to expand the population.

Threats 
Threats to the species include inappropriate fire regimes, weed invasion, lack of regeneration, erosion, agricultural chemical spray drift, roadworks, and grazing by introduced herbivores or domestic stock.

Ecological requirements for the Hairy-pod Wattle have not yet been studied and identified. While it is known that seedlings can grow without fire or soil disturbance, information on regeneration has not been studied.

See also
 List of Acacia' species

References

glandulicarpa
Plants described in 1897